USC&GS Pioneer is the name of more than one ship of the United States Coast and Geodetic Survey, and may refer to:

 , a survey ship in service from 1922 to 1941
 , a survey ship in service from 1941 to 1942
 , a survey ship in service from 1946 to 1966

Ships of the United States Coast and Geodetic Survey